The 1993 local elections in Zagreb were held on 7 February 1993. These were the first local elections since Croatia gained independence. The Croatian Democratic Union (HDZ) won a majority in the Zagreb Assembly with 35 seats out of 60 and Branko Mikša became the new Mayor of Zagreb.

Results

The Croatian Democratic Union (HDZ) won 46.60% of the votes or 220,501 and gained 35 out of 60 seats in the Assembly. The Croatian Social Liberal Party (HSLS) came second with 115,980 or 23.99% of the votes and 18 seats. Branko Mikša of the HDZ party was elected mayor. Half of the 60 members of the Assembly were elected proportionally using the D'Hondt method, and half were elected in 30 electoral districts by a majority system. The HSLS and the HNS competed together in most electoral districts, while the HDZ went independently.

References

See also
List of mayors of Zagreb

Zagreb 1993
Elections in Zagreb
Zagreb
Zagreb
1990s in Zagreb
February 1993 events in Europe